Pachykellya is a genus of very small saltwater clams, marine bivalve molluscs in the family Neoleptonidae.

Species
Species in the genus Pachykellya include:
 Pachykellya bernardi Powell, 1927
 Pachykellya concentrica Powell, 1927
 Pachykellya edwardsi Bernard, 1897
 Pachykellya minima Powell, 1931
 Pachykellya rotunda Powell, 1927

References
 Powell A. W. B., New Zealand Mollusca, William Collins Publishers Ltd, Auckland, New Zealand 1979 

Neoleptonidae
Bivalve genera